Megalopyge lanceolata is a moth of the family Megalopygidae. It was described by Paul Dognin in 1923.

References

Moths described in 1923
Megalopygidae